Bernard Charvin (born 28 September 1947 in Moûtiers) is a retired French alpine skier who competed in the men's downhill at the 1972 Winter Olympics.

External links
 sports-reference.com
 

1947 births
Living people
French male alpine skiers
Olympic alpine skiers of France
Alpine skiers at the 1972 Winter Olympics
Sportspeople from Savoie
20th-century French people